Haplogroup R, or R-M207, is a Y-chromosome DNA haplogroup. It is both numerous and widespread amongst modern populations.

Some descendant subclades have been found since pre-history in Europe, Central Asia and South Asia. Others have long been present, at lower levels, in parts of West Asia and Africa. Some authorities have also suggested, more controversially, that R-M207 has long been present among Native Americans in North America – a theory that has not yet been widely accepted.

According to geneticist Spencer Wells, haplogroup K, from which haplogroups P and Q descend, originated in the Middle East or Central Asia. However, Karafet et al. (2014) proposed that "rapid diversification ... of K-M526", also known as K2, likely occurred in Southeast Asia (near Indonesia) and later expanded to mainland Asia, although they could not rule out that it might have arisen in Eurasia and later went extinct there, and that either of these scenarios are "equally parsimonius".

Haplogroups R and Q emerged and diversified in Central Asia and spread across Eurasia in several expansion waves.

Structure

Origins
Geneticist Spencer Wells suggests that haplogroup K, from which haplogroup P descends, likely originated in the Middle East or Central Asia, perhaps in the region of Iran or Pakistan. Haplogroup P1 may have emerged in Southeast Asia, however according to Karafet, et al. this hypothesis is "parsimonius" and it is just as likely that it originated elsewhere in Eurasia. The SNP M207, which defines Haplogroup R, is believed to have arisen during the Upper Paleolithic era, about 27,000 years ago.

Only one confirmed example of basal R* has been found, in 24,000 year old remains, known as MA1, found at Mal'ta–Buret' culture near Lake Baikal in Siberia. (While a living example of R-M207(xM17,M124) was reported in 2012, it was not tested for the SNP M478; the male concerned – among a sample of 158 ethnic Tajik males from Badakshan, Afghanistan – may therefore belong to R2.)

It is possible that neither of the primary branches of R-M207, namely R1 (R-M173) and R2 (R-M479) still exist in their basal, original forms, i.e. R1* and R2*. No confirmed case, either living or dead, has been reported in scientific literature. (Although in the case of R2*, relatively little research has been completed.)
 
Despite the rarity of R* and R1*, the relatively rapid expansion – geographically and numerically – of subclades from R1 in particular, has often been noted: "both R1a and R1b comprise young, star-like expansions" .

The wide geographical distribution of R1b, in particular, has also been noted. Hallast et al. (2014) mentioned that living examples found in Central Asia included: 
 the "deepest subclade" of R-M269 (R1b1a1a2) – the most numerous branch of R1b in Western Europe, and;
 the rare subclade R-PH155 (R1b1b) found only in one Bhutanese individual and one Tajik.
(While Hallast et al. suggested that R-PH155 was "almost as old as the R1a/R1b split", R-PH155 was later discovered to be a subclade of R-L278 (R1b1) and has been given the phylogenetic name R1b1b.)

Hallast et al. 2020 hypothesizes that haplogroup P spread to Central Asia and Oceania from Southeast Asia. R and Q emerged and diversified in Central Asia and spread across Eurasia in several migrations and expansions.

Distribution
Y-haplogroup R-M207 is common throughout Europe, South Asia and Central Asia . It also occurs in the Caucasus and Siberia. Some minorities in Africa also carry subclades of R-M207 at high frequencies.

While some indigenous peoples of The Americas and Australasia also feature high levels of R-M207, it is unclear whether these are deep-rooted, or an effect of European colonisation during the early modern era.

R (R-M207) 

Haplogroup R* Y-DNA (xR1,R2) was found in 24,000-year-old remains from Mal'ta in Siberia near Lake Baikal.
In 2013, R-M207 was found in one out of 132 males from the Kyrgyz people of East Kyrgyzstan.

R1 (R-M173) 

R-M173, also known as R1, has been common throughout Europe and South Asia since pre-history. It has many branches ( and ).

It is the second most common haplogroup in Indigenous peoples of the Americas following haplogroup Q-M242, especially in the Algonquian peoples of Canada and the United States . The reasons for high levels of R-M173 among Native Americans are a matter of controversy:
 some scholars claim that this is partly or wholly the result of colonial-era immigration from Europe (see e.g. ), whereas;
 other authorities point to the greater similarity of many R-M173 subclades found in North America to those found in Siberia (e.g.  and ), suggesting prehistoric immigration from Asia and/or Beringia.

R2 (R-M479) 

Haplogroup R-M479 is defined by the presence of the marker M479. The paragroup for the R-M479 lineage is found predominantly in South Asia, although deep-rooted examples have also been found among Portuguese, Spanish, Tatar (Bashkortostan, Russia), and Ossetian (Caucasus) populations .

One rare subclade may occur only among Ashkenazi Jews, possibly as a result of a founder effect.

See also 
Mal'ta–Buret' culture
Prehistoric Asia
Prehistoric Europe

Genetics

Y-DNA R-M207 subclades

Y-DNA backbone tree

References

Further reading

External links 

Discussion and projects
Yahoo group Y-DNA Haplogroup R
Family Tree DNA R2-M124-WTY (Walk Through the Y) Project
Family Tree DNA R-Arabia Y-DNA Project

R
R